The 1988 United States presidential election in Alaska took place on November 8, 1988. All 50 states and the District of Columbia, were part of the 1988 United States presidential election. Alaska voters chose three electors to the Electoral College, which selected the president and vice president.

Alaska was won by incumbent United States Vice President George H. W. Bush of Texas, who was running against Massachusetts Governor Michael Dukakis. Bush ran with Indiana Senator Dan Quayle as Vice President, and Dukakis ran with Texas Senator Lloyd Bentsen.

Bush won the election in Alaska with a resounding 23 point sweep-out landslide. Alaska has sent Republican electors to the Electoral College during every election in its history – except in 1964, where electors were sent for Democrat Lyndon B. Johnson. The election results in Alaska are reflective of a nationwide reconsolidation of base for the Republican Party, which took place throughout the 1980s. Through the passage of some very controversial economic programs, spearheaded by then President Ronald Reagan (called, collectively, "Reaganomics"), the mid-to-late 1980s saw a period of economic growth and stability. The hallmark for Reaganomics was, in part, the wide-scale deregulation of corporate interests, and tax cuts for the wealthy. 

Dukakis ran on a socially liberal platform and advocated for higher economic regulation and environmental protection. Bush, alternatively, ran on a campaign of continuing Reagan's social and economic policies, which gained him much support with social conservatives and people living in rural areas. Additionally, while the economic programs passed under Reagan and furthered under Bush and Bill Clinton may have boosted the economy for a brief period, they are criticized by many analysts as "setting the stage" for economic troubles in the United States after 2007, such as the Great Recession.

The election was rather multi-partisan for Alaska, with nearly 5% of the votes going to third-party candidates. Leading the third-party turnout in Alaska, and with one of their best turnouts nationwide, Texas Congressman Ron Paul with running-mate and Alaska Legislator Andre Marrou were able to pull nearly 3% of votes in the state on the Libertarian Party ticket.

Alaska weighed in for this election as 16% more Republican than the national average.

Results

See also
 Oil Pipelines in Alaska
 Presidency of George H. W. Bush
 United States presidential elections in Alaska

References

1988 Alaska elections
Alaska
1988